Zghurivka Raion was a raion (district) in Kyiv Oblast of Ukraine. Its administrative center was the urban-type settlement of Zghurivka. The raion was abolished on 18 July 2020 as part of the administrative reform of Ukraine, which reduced the number of raions of Kyiv Oblast to seven. The area of Zghurivka Raion was merged into Brovary Raion.

At the time of disestablishment, the raion consisted of one hromada, Zghurivka settlement hromada with the administration in Zghurivka.

References

Former raions of Kyiv Oblast
1986 establishments in Ukraine
Ukrainian raions abolished during the 2020 administrative reform